Alem Mujaković (born 6 April 1978) is a Slovenian footballer playing for NK Rudar Velenje as a midfielder.

External links
Profile at Prvaliga.si 

1978 births
Living people
Place of birth missing (living people)
NK Rudar Velenje players
Slovenian footballers
Association football midfielders